This list of bridges in Serbia lists bridges of particular historical, scenic, architectural or engineering interest. Road and railway bridges, viaducts, aqueducts and footbridges are included.

Historical and architectural interest bridges

Major road and railway bridges 
This table presents the structures with spans greater than 100 meters (non-exhaustive list).

Other bridges 
This table presents the structures with spans greater than 100 meters (non-exhaustive list).

Notes and references 
 Notes

 

 Others references

See also 

 List of crossings of the Danube
 Bridges of Belgrade
 Transport in Serbia
 Roads in Serbia
 Serbian Railways
 Geography of Serbia

External links

Further reading 
 
 
 

Serbia
 
Bridges
Bridges